Władysław Stecyk (born 14 July 1951 in Radowo Małe) is a Polish wrestler who competed in the 1976 Summer Olympics, 1980 Summer Olympics and 1988 Summer Olympics.

Silver medalist at the 1980 Summer Olympics in wrestling in 52 kg category (flyweight).

External links
sports-reference

1951 births
Living people
Olympic wrestlers of Poland
Wrestlers at the 1976 Summer Olympics
Wrestlers at the 1980 Summer Olympics
Wrestlers at the 1988 Summer Olympics
Polish male sport wrestlers
Olympic medalists in wrestling
People from Łobez County
Sportspeople from West Pomeranian Voivodeship
Medalists at the 1980 Summer Olympics
Olympic silver medalists for Poland
20th-century Polish people
21st-century Polish people